Julian Newman  (born September 6, 2001) is an American basketball player who graduated from Prodigy Prep in Orlando, Florida in 2020. He stands   and plays the point guard position.

Newman came to attention in 2012 for his viral highlight videos on YouTube, while playing varsity basketball for Downey Christian School in fifth grade. He sparked polarized opinions, with some outlets touting him as a child prodigy and others criticizing the way he was marketed.

Early life 
At age three, Newman began showing interest in basketball and his father Jamie soon had him play with regulation-size balls and in recreational leagues with older boys. His father trained him rigorously from a young age, with Newman reportedly making 100 free throws, 200 floaters, and 200 jump shots each day at practice.

Middle school career 
In the fall of 2012, after initially attending public schools, Newman transferred to Downey Christian School, a small private school in Orlando, Florida, after his father began coaching basketball and teaching history at the school. As a fifth grader, he began playing basketball for the middle school team. But after seeing immediate success, scoring as many as 91 points in a game, he was promoted to the varsity team. His team competed outside the jurisdiction of the Florida High School Athletic Association (FHSAA). Despite wearing the smallest available uniform, he had to tighten the shoulders of his jersey with a hair tie and roll the waistband of his shorts to prevent them from falling off. Through his first three starts, he averaged 12.4 points, 11 assists, and 4.3 steals per game. He led Downey Christian to a 21–6 record while leading the state of Florida in assists.

In sixth grade, Newman averaged 17 points per game. On December 19, 2012, Newman featured in an article on high school sports website MaxPreps, titled, "Fifth grader starting for Florida varsity team." A highlight video of Newman posted to YouTube by recruiting website ScoutsFocus went viral, receiving over 3.5 million views. He soon began making national headlines, including in Sports Illustrated and The New York Times, for being a fifth grader playing varsity basketball. Newman made television appearances on Steve Harvey, The Ellen DeGeneres Show, Good Morning America, and other programs. He was also invited to perform at half-time during an Orlando Magic NBA game.

In December 2013, Newman was tabbed "The Best Sixth Grade Basketball Player You've Ever Seen" by The Huffington Post. By that time, he was averaging 13.6 points and 10.5 assists per game. In 2014, he was labeled by the Tampa Bay Times as "the most marketed 12-year-old basketball player in the world". The efforts to market Newman's career were criticized by some media outlets, who compared him to a child star. As a seventh grader in 2015, Newman became the youngest player to record 1,000 career varsity points. He finished the 2014–15 season averaging 19.8 points, 10.2 assists, and 3.2 steals per game. On October 4, 2016, Newman scored 52 points in a highly publicized match-up with top 2020 class recruit Kyree Walker at the MiddleSchoolHoopsTV camp.  His highlight video from the game received over 13 million views on YouTube.

High school career 
By 2018, when he was a sophomore in high school, Newman had recorded 3,873 total points, surpassing the Florida prep record set by Teddy Dupay in 1998. In the 2018–19 season, he averaged 34.7 points, seven assists, five rebounds, and four steals per game.

For his senior season, Newman transferred to Prodigy Prep, a new school based in Orlando and created by his father, who would coach the basketball team.

Personal life 
Julian Newman is of Jewish, African American and Puerto Rican descent. His father, Jamie Newman, played basketball as a point guard for Colonial High School in Orlando; he is a history teacher and head basketball coach at Downey Christian School. Newman's mother Vivian Gonzalez is Puerto Rican. Gonzalez played point guard for University High School in Orlando, Florida, before serving four years in the United States Navy and then working for the United States Postal Service. Newman's younger sister Jaden began playing varsity basketball for Downey Christian in third grade, drawing national attention and appearing on television programs like The Queen Latifah Show. She was reportedly recruited by NCAA Division I program Miami (Florida) at age nine.

In 2015, Newman began starring in his own documentary series, "Born Ready," uploaded by YouTube channel Elite Mixtapes. Newman and his family also feature in the reality show "Hello Newmans," launched by sports network Overtime in 2019.

Newman is associated with his family's sports apparel brand Prodigy. Brand merchandise has been sold at his games.

Hello Newmans is a reality TV web series on YouTube, Snapchat, Instagram and Facebook by Overtime.

References 

2001 births
Living people
African-American basketball players
American men's basketball players
Basketball players from Orlando, Florida
Point guards
American sportspeople of Puerto Rican descent
21st-century African-American sportspeople